Patrick Jean André Mouratoglou (born 8 June 1970) is a French tennis coach and sports commentator of Greek descent. He was the coach of Serena Williams from June 2012 to 2022. Since Spring 2022, Mouratoglou has been the coach of Simona Halep.

Coaching career
He founded the Mouratoglou Tennis Academy in 1996 near Paris (later relocated to the outskirts of Nice), and has coached many up-and-coming players, including Marcos Baghdatis (whom he coached to the final of the 2006 Australian Open), Julia Vakulenko, Anastasia Pavlyuchenkova, Aravane Rezaï, Irena Pavlovic, Jérémy Chardy, Laura Robson, Yanina Wickmayer and Grigor Dimitrov.

Mouratoglou started coaching the ATP player Marcos Baghdatis in 1999 when Mouratoglou invited him to his Tennis Academy in October 1999, on a one-week basis. Baghdatis was, according to Mouratoglou, "not an athlete at all", however within seven years he would become a junior world No. 1, win the 2003 Australian Open boys' title, reach the final of the same tournament in 2006 and reach the world's top ten.

In July 2007, he started coaching Anastasia Pavlyuchenkova. Within two years, Pavlyuchenkova reached the world's top 30 and has since made two Grand Slam quarterfinals and reached a career-high ranking of world No. 13. They ended their association in August 2009, and Mouratoglou moved onto coaching both Aravane Rezaï and Yanina Wickmayer. Rezaï enjoyed a successful 2010 season, entering the world's top 20 and winning the Premier event in Madrid whilst Wickmayer reached a career-high ranking of world No. 12, in April 2010. Mouratoglou stopped working with both Rezaï and Wickmayer in August 2010 and April 2012, respectively.

In December 2010, Mouratoglou started coaching Laura Robson, who was world No. 217 at the time and still struggling to break into the senior tour. They worked together for six months before separating shortly before Wimbledon in 2011, when Robson was still struggling to make any progress on the WTA Tour, having slipped further to world No. 257. During this same period, Mouratoglou also coached Jérémy Chardy within his academy.

In March 2012, Mouratoglou started coaching Grigor Dimitrov and set about guiding him back into the world's top 100, having dropped to No. 102 by the time he started. This association ended in September that year and Mouratoglou moved on to coaching Serena Williams.

By the time Mouratoglou started coaching Williams, she had just suffered her first-ever opening-round defeat in the main draw of a Grand Slam tournament, losing in the first round of the 2012 French Open. Since then, Mouratoglou has guided Williams to her fifth, sixth and seventh Wimbledon titles, the Olympic gold medal, her fourth, fifth, and sixth US Open titles, her second and third French Open titles, three consecutive year-end championships titles, her sixth and seventh Australian Open title and lifted her back to No. 1 in the WTA rankings.

In 2015, Stefanos Tsitsipas started training in his tennis academies, as well as being coached by Patrick Mouratoglou and his father Apostolos Tsitsipas.

In spring 2022, Simona Halep began training with Mouratoglou.  He began coaching rising young phenom Holger Rune in October of 2022 in the absence of Halep from the WTA Tour due to her doping suspension, and helped lead him to his first Masters 1000 Title, defeating Novak Djokovic in the final.

References

External links
 Official website

1970 births
Living people
French people of Greek descent
French tennis coaches
People from Neuilly-sur-Seine
Sportspeople from Hauts-de-Seine